The Optibet Latvian Futsal Higher League is the premier futsal championship in Latvia. It is organized since 1997 by the Latvian Indoor Football Association (LTFA) under the supervision of the Latvian Football Federation. The champion qualifies for the UEFA Futsal Cup. The most successful team in the history of the league has been FK Nikars, winning 12 titles.

Since the 2017-18 season, the league is sponsored by betting firm Optibet.

Past winners 

 1997–98: Spīdvejs Daugavpils
 1998–99: AVG Rīga
 1999–2000: Lido Rīga
 2000–01: FK Policija Rīga
 2001–02: FK Policija Rīga
 2002–03: Viesnīca OMA Rīga
 2003–04: Bugroff Rīga
 2004–05: FK Raba Rīga
 2005–06: FK Raba Rīga
 2006–07: FK Kimmel/Kauguri Jūrmala
 2007–08: FK Nikars
 2008–09: FK Nikars
 2009–10: FK Nikars
 2010–11: FK Nikars
 2011–12: FK Nikars
 2012–13: FK Nikars
 2013–14: FK Nikars
 2014–15: FK Nikars
 2015–16: FK Nikars
 2016–17: FK Nikars
 2017–18: FK Nikars
 2018–19: FK Nikars

References

External links
Optibet Virslīga at the LTFA website (in Latvian)
The Futsal Higher League at the Latvian Football Federation 
 Uefa.com 
 Futsalplanet.com 

Futsal in Latvia
futsal
Latvia
1997 establishments in Latvia
Sports leagues established in 1997